Schirin Grace Sigrist (born March 16, 1995), known professionally as Shy Carlos, is a Filipino actress  and recording artist. She is a former member of the all-female group called Pop Girls.

She gained wide recognition for her role as Jackie Reyes in the teen romance film based on the best-selling romantic novel of the same name Para sa Hopeless Romantic (2015) and its sequel Para sa Broken Hearted (2018). She also appeared in such films as Chain Mail (2015), Pagsanib Kay Leah Dela Cruz (2017) and The Barker (2017).

On television, she has played Gayle Fresnido in Bagets: Just Got Lucky (2011–2012),  Maria Rosario Jonina "Joni" Quijano in Be Careful With My Heart (2014), Tasya / Princess Anastacia in Tasya Fantasya (2016),  Alon in Bagani (2018)  and various roles in Maalaala Mo Kaya and Ipaglaban Mo!.

She is also a VJ for the music channel MTV Pinoy.

Career

Early work – 2010
Carlos started doing several T.V. commercials at the early age of 4. She then embarked on singing and dancing when she was 10 years old.

In 2008, she was one of the supporting cast in Codename: Asero as Agent Pigtails.

She debuted in the all female group, Pop Girls which was launched by Viva Entertainment in 2009 alongside the Nadine Lustre, Rose Ginkel and twins Lailah and Mariam Bustria. At the time, she was using her former screen name Schai Sigrist.

She eventually left the group to start a career in acting and was temporarily replaced by Carlyn Ocampo and Aubrey Caraan.

2011–2012: Bagets: Just Got Lucky and A Secret Affair
She began using the professional name Shy Carlos and made her acting debut in the television remake of the 1984 film Bagets: Just Got Lucky as Gayle Fresnido. She also guested in some episodes of Maynila and Maalaala Mo Kaya, performed on Hey it's Saberdey! and Sunday Funday and later starred in the comedy fantasy series Kapitan Awesome as Dina Lang.

Carlos also made her film debut in the romantic drama film A Secret Affair as May Delgado.

2013–2016: Be Careful With My Heart and Para sa Hopeless Romantic
Carlos played Bianca in Annaliza, alongside Khalil Ramos who appeared as her ex-boyfriend. She also appeared in "Wedding Booth" and "Diploma" episodes of Maalaala Mo Kaya and "My Gimik Girl" episode of Maynila. She started appearing in the cable teen gag show Wapak and participated in When the Love is Gone as Chloe.

In 2014, she was cast in Be Careful With My Heart as Joni. On 14 July, she officially debuted as the newest VJ in MTV Pinoy.

She appeared in the teen romance film based on the best-selling romantic novel of the same name Para sa Hopeless Romantic as Jackie Reyes  and horror film Chain Mail.

She also played the lead role in the remake of the fantasy-romance drama Tasya Fantasya as Tasya / Prinsesa Anastacia which was played before by Kris Aquino in 1994 and Yasmien Kurdi in 2008.

Filmography

Television

Film

Discography

Albums

Singles

Music video appearances

Awards and nominations

References

External links
 
 
 

1995 births
Living people
Filipino film actresses
Filipino television actresses
Filipino people of Swiss descent
VJs (media personalities)
Swiss film actresses
Swiss television actresses
Swiss people of Filipino descent
Swiss female models
Viva Artists Agency